Robert Oliver Ritchie  is the H.T. and Jessie Chua Distinguished Professor of Engineering at the University of California, Berkeley and Senior Faculty Scientist at the Lawrence Berkeley National Laboratory.

Education 
Ritchie received Master of Arts (MA), Doctor of Philosophy (PhD) and Doctor of Science (ScD) degrees in Physics and Materials Science from the University of Cambridge. During his PhD, he worked with John F. Knott.

Career and research 
Ritchie is known for his research into the mechanics and micromechanisms of fracture and fatigue of a broad range of biological and structural materials, where he has provided a microstructural basis for their damage tolerance and fatigue limits.   his interests are focused on high entropy alloys and bulk metallic glasses, the structural integrity of human bone, and the development of novel structural materials from biologically inspired engineering.

Awards and honors 
Ritchie has won numerous awards including the David Turnbull Lectureship from the Materials Research Society in 2013, the Acta Materialia Gold Medal in 2014, and the Morris Cohen Award from The Minerals, Metals & Materials Society (TMS) in 2017. He was also the inaugural winner of the Sir Alan Cottrell Gold Medal from the International Congress on Fracture in 2009. 

Ritchie is a Fellow of the Royal Academy of Engineering, the National Academy of Engineering of the United States, the Russian Academy of Sciences and the Royal Swedish Academy of Engineering Sciences and was elected a Foreign Member of the Royal Society (ForMemRS) in 2017.

References 

Foreign Members of the Royal Society
Fellows of the Royal Academy of Engineering
Foreign Members of the Russian Academy of Sciences
Living people
Year of birth missing (living people)
Fellows of the Minerals, Metals & Materials Society